Yvette Lewis is an American political executive and activist serving as the chair of the Maryland Democratic Party. Lewis assumed the role in December 2019, succeeding acting chair Cory V. McCray. Lewis has previously served as chair of the party from 2011 to 2015.

Lewis was a superdelegate at the 2016 Democratic National Convention. She is also a professional opera singer and lives in Bowie, Maryland.

References

External links

African-American people in Maryland politics
African-American women in politics
Living people
Maryland Democratic Party chairs
Women in Maryland politics
Year of birth missing (living people)
21st-century African-American politicians
21st-century African-American women
Howard University alumni
21st-century African-American musicians
21st-century American women opera singers
African-American women opera singers
Singers from Maryland